The Kasuga Helicopter Airlift Squadron also known as the Kasuga Helicopter Transport Squadron is a unit of the Japan Air Self-Defense Force. It comes under the authority of the Air Rescue Wing. It is commanded from Kasuga Air Base in Fukuoka Prefecture, but its aircraft are actually based at the nearby Fukuoka Airport. It is equipped with CH-47J aircraft.

Tail marking
As with other helicopter airlift squadrons, it has the emblem of the Air Rescue Wing with a sticker stating the home base of the unit.

Aircraft operated
 CH-47J

References

Units of the Japan Air Self-Defense Force